Ivana Dobrakovová (born 1982) is a Slovak writer and translator. She was born in Bratislava and studied English and French translation and interpretation at Comenius University. Her first short story collection titled Prvá smrť v rodine appeared in 2009, followed by her debut novel Bellevue (2010). Her second collection of short stories titled Toxo appeared in 2013, followed by her fourth book Matky a kamionisti (2018). All four books were shortlisted for the Anasoft Litera Prize, and Matky a kamionisti also won the EU Prize for Literature. 

Dobrakovová lives in Turin where she is working on translating the Neapolitan novels of Elena Ferrante.

References

1982 births
Living people
Slovak writers